Arad Central railway station is the largest railway station in the city of Arad, and the largest in the Arad County. It is the second largest railway station in the western region of Romania, immediately after Timișoara Nord railway station.

History
The main building was designed by Hungarian architect Ferenc Pfaff, when Arad was a major city of the Austro-Hungarian Empire.

Operators
The station is being served by the national operator CFR, which owns the station building and infrastructure, and the private operator Regiotrans.

Arad Central services are in majority connected to the CFR 200 Main Line from Brașov/Bucureṣti Nord to Curtici. The Arad–Curtici line is the main railway link to Western Europe toward Budapest Keleti.

ICN/IC services

International IR services

Lines
 Line 200 : Curtici–Arad–Deva–Vințu de Jos–Sibiu–Făgăraș–Brașov (to Bucharest it continues as the 1000 main line)
 Line 215 : Arad–Arad Vest–Pecica–Semlac–Șeitin–Nădlac
 Line 216 : Arad–Aradul Nou–Zădăreni–Bodrogul Nou–Felnac–Sânpetru German–Munar–Secusigiu–Aranca–Periam–Saravale–Sânnicolau Mare–Dudeștii Noi–Vălcani
 Line 310 : Timișoara–Arad–Sântana–Nădab–Ciumeghiu–Oradea
 Line 317 : Arad–Ineu–Gurahonţ–Brad

References

Railway stations in Romania
Buildings and structures in Arad, Romania
Railway stations opened in 1858
Ferenc Pfaff railway stations
Arad Central Railway Station